Orra or ORRA may refer to:

People:
 Orra White Hitchcock (1796–1863), American scientific illustrator

Orra E. Monnette (1873–1936), American attorney, author and banker
Other:
Orra Jewellery, Indian jewellery store chain
Oria, Apulia, village in southern Italy
Oriental Rug Retailers of America
Obamacare Repeal Reconciliation Act of 2017, a proposed name for the American Health Care Act of 2017

See also
Ora (disambiguation)